Gò Vấp is a district of Ho Chi Minh City. Since the 80s, it has undergone significant urbanization. It is more populous than most of the other districts.

A high urbanization rate has made Gò Vấp become one of the three districts that has high population growth in the city. Specifically, Gò Vấp had 144,000 people in 1976, and the population increased to 223,000 people in 1995, 231,000 people in 2000, 413,000 people in 2003, and 455,000 people in 2004. From 1980 to 2003, the population of Gò Vấp increased to nearly 3 times its population, and on average, increased 13.66% annually. According to the population census in 2017, the population of Gò Vấp was 663,313 people.

Geography and administration 

Gò Vấp is an urban district located in the north and northwest of Ho Chi Minh City, Vietnam. Gò Vấp borders District 12 in the north and west, Phú Nhuận District in the south, Tân Bình District in the west, and Bình Thạnh District in the east.

In July 1976, two wards (Bình Hòa and Thạnh Mỹ Tây) split from Gò Vấp District to create Bình Thạnh district. Later, the ward of Mỹ Bình joined Củ Chi district, and Nha Binh, Thành Lộc, An Phú Đông and Tân Thới Hiệp joined Hóc Môn district. Gò Vấp District now consists of 16 wards—1, 3, 4, 5, 6, 7, 8, 9, 10, 11, 12, 13, 14, 15, 16 and 17—and is mostly residential.

Historically, Gò Vấp was part of Gia Định province until 1976, when the province was renamed Ho Chi Minh City.

Population 
According to the population census in 2017 of Ho Chi Minh City's Census Bureau, the district's population was 663,313 people, and the population density was 33,602 people per square kilometer. There are 8 ethnic groups in Gò Vấp, which are the Kinh people (98%), the Hoa people (1.8%), and the other 6 minor ethnic groups (0.2%).

References

Districts of Ho Chi Minh City